Talabuga Khan,  Tulabuga, Talubuga or Telubuga was the Khan of the Golden Horde, independent division of the Mongol Empire from 1287 until 1291. He was the son of Tartu, great-grandson of Batu Khan, and great-great-great-grandson of Genghis Khan.

Military career

Rise to Military Prominence 

As a young Mongol prince, Talabuga led men during the Mongol invasion of Lithuania under the overall command of Burundai in 1258-1259, a campaign in which Talabuga distinguished himself.  This Mongol invasion of Lithuania is generally regarded by historians as a Mongol victory, with Lithuanian territories having been described as "devastated" after the Mongol incursion.

One year later, Talabuga led the second Mongol invasion of Poland alongside Nogai Khan, both again under the overall command of Burundai (Borolday).

Nogai had devised an invasion plan for the second Mongol invasion of Hungary, and in 1285 Talabuga joined him for this raid. As a matter of rule, the Galician and Rus' dukes were ordered to accompany the Mongol raid on Hungary together with Tulabuga and Nogai in 1285. The Khan of the Golden Horde at this time was Tode Mongke, who did not participate in the campaign, remaining instead in his winter quarters with his court and entourage. Heavy rains and snows resulted in the overflowing of rivers, which turned the countryside into a vast quagmire, and the Mongol forces lost many men on their advance, before the invasion was fully underway. Nogai's column invaded Transylvania. Although Nogai and his Tatars plundered villages and some cities, they were beaten back by the Hungarian royal army and Vlachs upon their return. Talabuga's column invaded via Transcarpathia. The advance of Talabuga's forces was significantly impeded by the heavy snows of the Carpathian Mountains, resulting in the loss of horses, food, and supplies which caused many thousands of Talabuga's men to die. Though greatly weakened by environmental factors, Talabuga's forces sacked and destroyed the fortified monastery of Sarivar (Sarvar?),  devastated central Hungary, and burned down the city of Pest, which may have largely been abandoned in fear of the Mongol advance. On the journey back from Hungary, Talabuga's forces were ambushed by the light cavalry of the Székely people.

Afterwards, Talabuga ordered his starving forces to attack the cities of the Kingdom of Ruthenia, ruled at the time by King Leo I of Galicia. Talabuga and his forces overtook the Volhynian defenders and plundered their cities, despite these being loyal to his allies within the Golden Horde, including Nogai.

Ascendancy to Khan of the Golden Horde 

Shortly thereafter, Talabuga became the Khan of the Ulus of Jochi. The previous Khan, Tode Mongke, had been a passive, religious Khan, neglecting the affairs of state, and had been made to understand that the state needed a more active ruler. He abdicated the throne in favor of his nephew Talabuga, a proven Mongol warrior. With this, Talabuga Khan became the Khan of the Golden Horde. It is possible that Tode Mongke was allowed to live out his days in peace. However, according to the account of Marco Polo, one of the first acts of Talabuga Khan (acting in concert with Nogai) as the Khan of the Golden Horde was putting Tode Mongke to death.

Talabuga Khan was, in a sense, the rightful heir to the throne, as he represented the senior branch of the family of his great-grandfather Batu Khan, the founder of the Golden Horde. Talabugha Khan was the eldest son of Tartu, who was the eldest son of Toqoqan, who despite being Batu's second son became the head of the family with the extinguishment of the line of Sartaq (Batu's eldest son). This was in contrast to Nogai, whose grandfather was Jochi's seventh son, as Nogai was descended from a concubine and could therefore not become the Khan of the Golden Horde himself.

As Khan of the Golden Horde, Talabuga Khan empowered his closest generals, which included his younger brother Kunjuk-bugha (Kunjukbuga), and his cousins who were the sons of the late Mengu-Timur Khan, particularly Mengu-Timur's eldest son Alguy (Alqui).

After consolidating his power, Talabuga Khan raided the Kingdom of Ruthenia in the latter half of 1287. This was likely his first military operation as the Khan of the Golden Horde. Talabuga Khan and his Mongol forces successfully plundered the Kingdom of Ruthenia, particularly the region of Volodymyr.

Third Mongol Invasion of Poland 

Talabuga Khan then led the Third Mongol invasion of Poland in 1287-88.  This would prove to be the largest Mongol invasion of Poland in history.  Talabuga Khan ordered the princes of the western Rus principalities to join him for the invasion in person with their armies. The first Rus prince to join him was Prince Mstislav of Lutsk, whose army met with the Mongol forces at the Horyn river. Talabuga Khan mustered his troops near Volodymyr in the recently plundered Volhynia. Prince Volodymir and even King Leo I of Galicia would also join him with their armies as his new vassals. In addition to these three Rus princes, Talabuga Khan was joined by Alguy, the son of the late Mengu-Timur Khan, as well as by the powerful Nogai and his army. Modern historians cite that a host personally commanded by the Khan of the Golden Horde and accompanied by such powerful allies, all of whom were present in person, must by definition have been exceedingly large. The sources do not give exact numbers but rather cite an “innumerable swarm” or a “great host” as per the Galician-Volhynian chronicle. Talabuga Khan left a detachment of Tatar warriors in Volhynia to guard his rear against any vengeful Rus forces or hostile Lithuanians. In December 1287, Talabuga Khan, Alguy, and Nogai crossed into Polish lands and entered the Duchy of Lesser Poland with 30,000 cavalry riding at their backs, according to modern estimates. In Poland, Talabuga Khan personally commanded an army of 20,000 men, mostly his own Mongol troops but also including the Rus auxiliary forces, while Nogai commanded approximately 10,000 men (one tumen), which were entirely of Mongol/Turkic ethnicity with no sources citing Rus forces in Nogai’s branch of the army.

Talabuga’s army enjoyed initial success: the “invaders advanced among smoking churches and monasteries through the districts of Lublin” and Masovia, though notably they did not attempt to take the keep at Lublin, likely to preserve the momentum of their initial advance. Talabuga’s forces then besieged the city of Sandomierz, where some Polish knights had already been mustered. Shortly thereafter, Krakow was also besieged by the Mongols. The Polish defenders were taken by surprise, but quickly adopted a new strategy which differed from the previous Mongol invasions: rather than riding out to meet the Mongols in the field, as they had done in the first two invasions, Polish knights fought dismounted on the battlements of their castles and towns, shoulder to shoulder with the townsfolk. This was to be followed by a second phase of riding out from these fortified places to meet weakened or isolated Mongol units in skirmishes and pitched battles. Among the Polish defenders, there was a larger amount of Polish knights than in earlier Mongol invasions. Overall, this proved to be a more effective strategy. Though Krakow now had a castle made of stone as well as improved city defenses, the Mongols were aware of the considerable riches within, and stormed the walls. The Polish defenders managed to repulse this attack. The Mongols responded by lifting the siege and raiding the countryside. After the defense of Krakow, Duke Leszek the Black and a small retinue of his warriors slipped out of Krakow and rode to Hungary, where the Duke personally asked his longtime ally King Ladislaus IV of Hungary for reinforcements. Sandomierz would also remain in Polish hands despite having been besieged. Talabuga Khan then likely decided to leave his Rus regiments encamped around Sandomierz with the intent of immobilizing the Polish forces within, and took his Mongol army on a raid through the countryside, sending small raiding parties out to capture more slaves and loot. There is also some evidence that Talabuga Khan and/or his retinue spent time in a small keep or manor in the village of Goślice at some point during the invasion, which lies a considerable distance to the west of Sandomierz. However, Talabuga Khan’s army lost a pitched battle somewhere “in the region of Sandomierz” at some point after breaking off the siege of the city. Talabuga then recalled his raiding parties back to his main force, in order to try to consolidate what plunder they had managed to take in what little time they had spent raiding. 

Nogai would eventually split his own army in two in order to also raid the countryside. The first of Nogai’s armies was defeated by Polish forces, which consisted largely of the local Polish highlander population, in the Podhale region, by the Dunajec river. Duke Leszek’s request for aid was granted by the Hungarian king, and a joint Polish-Hungarian army defeated Nogai’s second army near Sącz. Notably, some sources state that during the Polish campaign, Talabugha Khan and Nogai quarrelled and “separated and returned by different routes”, directly implying that the two Mongol leaders/armies had been together at some point during the Polish campaign. Overall, this Mongol invasion of Poland is generally considered a defeat for the Mongols of the Golden Horde.

Later Military Campaigns 

The Mongols left Poland in January 1288. Talabuga at this time decided to once again invade the Kingdom of Ruthenia with the Mongol and Turkic forces he had remaining, despite King Leo I having aided him in the failed Polish invasion. The Mongol Khan likely did this in order to make up for the losses suffered in the Polish campaign with the hope of acquiring more plunder and slaves, and also possibly in response to the Rus’ perceived lack of full commitment to the invasion of Poland from a military standpoint. Hence, as they left the Polish lands, Talabuga Khan and his army invaded the neighboring Kingdom of Ruthenia again, including the capital city Lviv, which they successfully plundered and devastated. Nogai’s army entered the lands of the Kingdom of Ruthenia a few days after Talabuga’s, specifically in late January 1288, raiding and hunting for survivors who had escaped the initial devastation of the Khan’s army. According to the Galician-Volhynian chronicle, King Leo I conducted a census in the immediate aftermath of Talabugha Khan and Nogai’s brutally effective 1288 invasion of the Kingdom of Ruthenia in order to count his own losses, and found that 12,500 of his men and women had either been killed in the fighting or taken into captivity by the Mongols.

The Mongol leadership then met at Volodymyr, where they divided their Polish and Rus slaves amongst themselves. According to the Galician-Volhynian chronicle, of “unmarried virgin girls” alone, the Mongols had enslaved twenty one thousand. Howorth writes that the slave count was 30,000 boys and maidens. Even though these numbers would have included both Polish and Rus slaves, Polish sources maintain that these numbers are an exaggeration. Krakowski estimates a maximum of “a few thousand” Polish slaves, and total deaths from the Mongol invasion on the Polish side to be “less” than the number enslaved.

Also in 1288, Prince Vladimir, in the presence of Tulabuga Khan and Alguy, decided to pass his throne on to Mstislav, the son of Danylo. King Leo attempted to prevent this from happening, by calling into mind the existence of "his friend" Khan Nogai. Prince Mstislav then forced him to withdraw, explaining that the power transfer was already made and agreed upon by the rulers of the Golden Horde and their counselors. It was a frightening prospect to make complaints to the Golden Horde.

In 1290, Talabuga Khan attacked the land of Zichia (Circassia), and ordered Nogai to join him with his forces in a grand raid. The campaign was militarily successful, as the Mongol armies under the command of Talabuga Khan slaughtered the native defenders and acquired much loot. At some point on their journey back to their winter lands, Talabugha Khan's forces were met with great snows, and got lost due to the weather. It was written they were forced to eat their hunting dogs, then their horses, and finally, their dead companions. For this, Talabuga Khan blamed Nogai (whose forces had split off earlier and arrived safely at their winter quarters), and a rift grew between the two men.

Raids against the Ilkhanate 

Tulabuga was primarily focused on Europe. During his reign as Khan of the Golden Horde, several significant border raids occurred between the Golden Horde and the Ilkhanate, specifically in 1288 and 1290.

Notably, Talabuga Khan never personally led his armies and never personally took the field in any of these engagements against the Ilkhanate. The borders did not significantly change between the two Mongol empires after these conflicts. This may have been because the rulers of the Ilkhanate were of Genghisid descent, like Talabuga Khan himself. Another reason for this may have been that Talabuga was a pious Sunni Muslim.

In the first of these raids, Talabugha Khan had commissioned an army of 5,000 men for a lightning raid against the Ilkhanate in 1288, in order to disrupt trade in Persia. The army of the Golden Horde had passed the defile of Derbend and succeeded in plundering the merchants there. The armies of the Ilkhanate were late to respond, setting out for Shaburan only to find that the cavalry of the Golden Horde had already retired with their loot.

In 1290, Nogai Khan led an army of 10,000 men of the Golden Horde in another raid against the Ilkhanate. Riding with Nogai were two of the sons of the late Khan Mengu-Timur, Abaji (Abachi?) and Mengli (Menglibuka). The Ilkhan Arghun rode to meet him with the armies of the Ilkhanate. The two armies met at the Karasu. Nogai was defeated, and 300 of his men were slain on the battlefield, with the victorious army of the Ilkhanate taking many more as prisoners. Arghun celebrated the victory by a feast at Pilsuvar.

Despite these raids, Tulabuga never sent envoys to Egypt to encourage the Mamluks to fight against his relatives in the Ilkhanate.

Death 

Nogai, who by 1291 was a crafty, experienced general and politician, feigned ignorance of how Talabuga Khan had come to hate him. He wrote letters to Talabuga Khan's mother about how he wanted to give his younger friend Talabuga Khan some advice. She in turn wrote to her son to trust Nogai, who had feigned serious illness. Nogai Khan went so far as to put fresh blood in his mouth on one occasion, in order to deceive Talabuga Khan's camp into thinking he was spitting blood and did not have long to live. In light of this, Talabuga Khan agreed to make amends with his former friend. He arrived to the appointed meeting place with only a small retinue which included Alguy, Toghrul, Bulakhan, Kadan, and Kutugan. It is unknown whether his brother Kunjukbuga was also present. Nogai had his men ready in ambush, and when they came forward he compelled Talabuga Khan to dismount. Talabuga Khan was then strangled by several of Nogai's men to avoid spilling his blood, as befit the Mongol custom of killing royalty. Nogai then placed Toqta (one of the younger sons of Mengu-Timur) on the throne, who ordered the deaths of the rest of Talabuga's retinue, which included Toqta's older brothers.

Genealogy
Genghis Khan
Jochi
Batu Khan
Toqoqan
Tartu
Talabuga Khan

See also
List of Khans of the Golden Horde

References

Khans of the Golden Horde
13th-century monarchs in Europe
Year of birth unknown
1291 deaths
13th-century executions